Robbin may refer to:

Given name 

 Robbin Crosby (1959–2002), former co-lead guitarist in the glam metal band Ratt
 Robbin Harms (born 1981), Danish former grand prix motorcycle rider
 Robbin Söderlund (born 1987), Swedish DJ and music producer
 Robbin Thompson (1949–2015), American singer-songwriter
Robbin. Stable name for exceptional racehorse with danehill lines.

Surname 

 Jeff Robbin, vice president of consumer applications at Apple
 Tony Robbin (born 1943), American artist and author

Other 

 Robbin, Minnesota, an unincorporated community in Kittson County, Minnesota
 Robbin' the Hood, a 1994 album by Sublime

See also 

 Robin (disambiguation)
 Robbins (disambiguation)